(born August 31, 1971) is a retired Japanese male backstroke swimmer. He represented Japan at the 1992 Summer Olympics in Barcelona, Spain. His best Olympic result was the 20th place (2:03.10) in the Men's 200m Backstroke event.

References
 sports-reference

1971 births
Living people
Olympic swimmers of Japan
Swimmers at the 1992 Summer Olympics
Asian Games medalists in swimming
Swimmers at the 1990 Asian Games
Japanese male backstroke swimmers
Asian Games silver medalists for Japan
Asian Games bronze medalists for Japan
Medalists at the 1990 Asian Games
20th-century Japanese people